Dora María Pérez Vidal (born 30 August 1933), known by her stage name Dora María and her nickname La Chaparrita de Oro (The Golden Short Woman), is a Mexican singer of folk music. She is a native of Tamulté de las Barrancas, a neighborhood of, Villahermosa, the capital of Tabasco, Mexico.

References

External links
 

1933 births
Singers from Tabasco
Mexican women singers
Ranchera singers
People from Villahermosa
Living people